Max Shiffman (30 October 1914, New York City – 2 July 2000, Hayward, California) was an American mathematician, specializing in the calculus of variations, partial differential equations, and hydrodynamics. He was a Guggenheim Fellow for the academic year 1951–1952.

Biography
Max Shiffman graduated with a bachelor's degree from City College of New York (CNNY) and then graduated in 1938 with a Ph.D. from New York University (NYU). His thesis was entitled The Plateau Problem for Minimal Surfaces of Arbitrary Topological Structure and his thesis advisor was Richard Courant. According to Peter Lax, Shiffman was "Courant's most brilliant student in America". Shiffman gave a one-hour address at a meeting of the American Mathematical Society. He was an instructor at CCNY in 1939–42. In 1942 at NYU he joined a research project funded by the Office of Scientific Research and Development. From 1945 to 1948 he was an associate professor at NYU, where he influenced many graduate students, including Clifford Gardner, Joe Keller, Martin Kruskal, Peter Lax, Cathleen Morawetz, and Louis Nirenberg. In 1948 Gábor Szegő hired Shiffman as a full professor at Stanford University. Szegő also brought to the Stanford mathematics department Donald C. Spencer, Albert Charles Schaeffer, Paul Garabedian, and Richard E. Bellman. Shiffman and Bellman introduced a number of modern mathematics courses at Stanford. Shiffman was the first to teach at Stanford a course on functional analysis. Merrill M. Flood's 1952 introduction to non-Soviet mathematicians of Kantorovich's 1939 paper Mathematical Methods of Organizing and Planning Production is due to Shiffman in 1949.

From 1965 to 1967 Shiffman held at Stanford a research appointment, mainly due to the efforts of Donald C. Spencer. At California State University, Hayward Shiffman was a full professor from 1967 to 1981, when he retired as professor emeritus.

In the summer of 1949 Shiffman gave a new proof of von Neumann's minimax theorem with a generalization to concave-convex functions. Maurice Sion generalized Shiffman's result to Sion's minimax theorem, published in 1958.

In 1938 Bella Manel, a mathematics graduate student at NYU, married Max Shiffman. She received her PhD in 1939 with thesis advisor Richard Courant. Max and Bella Shiffman divorced in 1957, after the birth of their two sons. Upon his death Max Shiffman was survived by his sons, Bernard, a professor of mathematics, and David, an owner of an investment company, and by five grandchildren.

Selected publications

1947

References

1914 births
2000 deaths
20th-century American mathematicians
Brooklyn College alumni
Applied mathematicians
Fluid dynamicists
Game theorists
PDE theorists
City College of New York alumni
New York University alumni
Stanford University faculty
California State University, East Bay faculty